Looe Bridge is a bridge in Looe, Cornwall, across the River Looe. Built in the 1850s to replace a dangerous 15th-century structure, the bridge carries the A387 road and is a Grade II listed building.

History

Early crossing (c. 1400–1405) 
This structure burned down in 1405.

Medieval bridge (1411–1853) 

The first stone bridge across the river in the town was built following a grant of 22 October 1411; construction took 25 years and was completed in 1436. Similarly disputed is the number of arches the bridge had – reports by John Leland describe either 12 or 16, The Gentleman's Magazine listed 13, Celia Fiennes referred to its 14 arches, William Borlase sketched and the National Heritage List for England states 15, and Thomas Bond specified 18. On the centre of the bridge was a chapel dedicated to Saint Anne; the first mention of the chapel is from 18 November 1436 when the chaplain obtained a license from Edmund Lacey to hold a wedding there. It is possible that the chapel was demolished at the time of the Reformation, although some traces were reported to have still existed when the bridge was demolished. In 1689 the bridge was "in general decay", and the repairs were seen to by the county authority. Granite plaques were installed at each end of the bridge, of which the west plaque still exists.

In 1478, William of Worcester referred to the bridge as Low Brygge, and described it as maximus pons – i.e. the largest bridge in Cornwall. In 1508, wealthy Cornwall merchant Thomas Yogge bequeathed a hundredweight of salt for repairs to the bridge, provided that the town of Loo  brought it from Plymouth at the town's own expense.
A notice placed in The London Gazette in 1847 stated of an intent to apply to parliament to improve and maintain Looe Harbour, and to "take down the bridge across the said harbour, and to build a new bridge instead thereof, with proper approaches and works connected therewith, at or near the site of the present bridge". The following year, the East and West Looe Harbour and Bridge Act was passed, which stated that "the present bridge across the harbour is dilapidated and ill built". A similar description of the old structure said that it was a "narrow time-eaten bridge [that] had become ruinous and dangerous". Conversely, a more contemporary report described it as "a very fine mediaeval bridge". Henderson and Coates suggested that had the narrowest part of the bridge been  like that at Wadebridge, it would have been spared – and that it was "a thousand pities" the builders had not done so.

Victorian bridge (1854–present) 
A grant for constructing a new bridge was made in 1852. Designed by William Pease of slatestone with granite dressings, the bridge cost £2,984 to construct. It has nine "misshapen" arches, of which seven span the river, one is a dry arch on the East Looe side, and one at the West Looe side forms a pedestrian passage.

The road carried by the bridge forms part of the A387 between Polbathic and Polperro. In 1993, the bridge and its six cast iron lamp standards were given Grade II listed status.

Footnotes

References 

Bridges completed in 1855
Bridges in Cornwall
Looe
Grade II listed bridges